Regional Command Southwest, abbreviated RC(SW), was an international military formation, of roughly division size, which was one of the components of the International Security Assistance Force in Afghanistan.  It was stood up on 3 July 2010 largely from an area previously in Regional Command South. It was headquartered at Camp Leatherneck with an area of responsibility of largely Helmand and Nimruz provinces.  The United States Marine Corps provides the majority of the force headquarters. It consisted of Task Force Helmand of the British Armed Forces (including Denmark and Estonia) and Task Force Leatherneck of the United States Marine Corps. Provincial Reconstruction Team Helmand was also located in Regional Command Southwest.

The command was stood down during 2014.

Previous commanders
Major General Richard P. Mills 2010-March 2011
Major General John A. Toolan March 2011-March 2012
Major General Charles M. Gurganus March 2012 – 2013
Major General Walter L. Miller 2013-2014
Brigadier General Dan Yoo 2014

See also
Train Advise Assist Command – Capital
Train Advise Assist Command – North
Train Advise Assist Command – East
Train Advise Assist Command – South
Train Advise Assist Command – West
Train Advise Assist Command – Air
NATO

References

External links

Official website

International Security Assistance Force units and formations (Afghanistan)
Military units and formations disestablished in 2014
Military units and formations established in 2010